Michaela Uhrová (born 10 April 1982 in Brandýs nad Labem-Stará Boleslav) is a Czech basketball player who competed in the 2004 Summer Olympics and in the 2008 Summer Olympics.

References

1982 births
Living people
People from Brandýs nad Labem-Stará Boleslav
Czech women's basketball players
Olympic basketball players of the Czech Republic
Basketball players at the 2004 Summer Olympics
Basketball players at the 2008 Summer Olympics
Sportspeople from the Central Bohemian Region